Adapting Minds: Evolutionary Psychology and the Persistent Quest for Human Nature is a book published by MIT Press written by philosopher of science David Buller, piecing together his criticism of evolutionary psychology. A large portion of the book is dedicated to a critique of empirical findings from three research groups in the field: that of David Buss, that of Cosmides and Tooby, and that of Daly and Wilson. Buller argues that the evolutionary psychology paradigms are "mistaken in almost every detail."

References

External links 
 
 Book page at Buller's university website

Philosophy books
Anthropology books
2005 non-fiction books
MIT Press books